Alberto Álvarez Muñoz (born 8 March 1991) is a Mexican athlete, who competes primarily in the triple jump. In 2016 he became the first Mexican triple jumper to compete at the Olympic Games.

International competitions

References

External links
 

1991 births
Living people
Mexican male triple jumpers
Olympic athletes of Mexico
Olympic male triple jumpers
Athletes (track and field) at the 2016 Summer Olympics
Pan American Games competitors for Mexico
Athletes (track and field) at the 2011 Pan American Games
World Athletics Championships athletes for Mexico
Competitors at the 2015 Summer Universiade
Competitors at the 2017 Summer Universiade
Competitors at the 2014 Central American and Caribbean Games
20th-century Mexican people
21st-century Mexican people